A desert island, deserted island, or uninhabited island, is an island, islet or atoll that is not permanently populated by humans. Uninhabited islands are often depicted in films or stories about shipwrecked people, and are also used as stereotypes for the idea of "paradise". Some uninhabited islands are protected as nature reserves, and some are privately owned. Devon Island in Canada's far north is the largest uninhabited island in the world.

Small coral atolls or islands usually have no source of fresh water, but occasionally a freshwater lens can be reached with a well.

Terminology
Uninhabited islands are sometimes also called "deserted islands" or "desert islands". In the latter, the adjective desert connotes not desert climate conditions, but rather "desolate and sparsely occupied or unoccupied". The word desert has been "formerly applied more widely to any wild, uninhabited region, including forest-land", and it is this archaic meaning that appears in the phrase "desert island".

The term "desert island" is also commonly used figuratively to refer to objects or behavior in conditions of social isolation and limited material means. Behavior on a desert island is a common thought experiment, for example, "desert island morality".

Biodiversity 
Desert islands are partly sheltered from humans, making them havens of peace for a number of fragile wildlife species such as sea turtles and ground-nesting seabirds. Many species of seabirds use them as stopovers on their way or especially for nesting, taking advantage of the (supposed) absence of terrestrial predators such as cats or rats.

However, tons of waste from far away countries accumulates on their beaches from the sea, and the absence of surveillance also makes them important spots for poachers of protected species.

List of selected uninhabited islands

 Amatignak Island, southernmost point of Alaska, USA
 Appat Island, Greenland
 ʻAta, the southernmost island of the Kingdom of Tonga
 Auckland Islands in the South Pacific, which are part of New Zealand
 Astola Island, Pakistan
 A majority of the Barra Isles, the Outer Hebrides, Scotland. The most famous of these is Barra Head.
 Blasket Islands in County Kerry, Ireland
 Ball's Pyramid, a tall volcanic mountain located close to Lord Howe Island in the South Pacific
 Binlang Islet, Lieyu Township (Lesser Kinmen), Kinmen County (Quemoy), Taiwan (Republic of China)
 Most of the Canadian Arctic Archipelago
 Caquorobert, Guernsey
 Clipperton Island, a Pacific island of France
 Coral Sea Islands off the northeastern coast of Australia
 De Long Islands in the Arctic Ocean, part of Russia
 Desertas Islands, Portugal
 Devon Island, the largest uninhabited island in the world at 55,247 km2
 Gotska Sandön, Sweden
 Heard Island and McDonald Islands, Australia
 Many islands within the waters of Hong Kong 
 Ilha da Queimada Grande "Snake Island", Brazil
 Isle Royale in Lake Superior
 Keros and other small islands off the coast of Greece
 Kermadec Islands, part of New Zealand
 Korzhin Island in Lake Balkhash
 Klein Curaçao, Curaçao
 Lampione, Sicily
 Lítla Dímun, Faroe Islands
 Luci Island in Xiuyu District, Putian, Fujian, China (PRC)
 Ogurchinsky Island in the Caspian Sea
 Rat Islands, a volcanic island in the Aleutian Islands
 Santa Luzia, Cape Verde
 Savage Islands, Portugal
 Shag Rocks (South Georgia)
 Surtsey, a volcanic island located south of Iceland
 Tetepare Island, the largest uninhabited island in the South Pacific
 Topo Islet, Azores, Portugal
 Most of the United States Minor Outlying Islands, such as Johnston Atoll, Wake Island and Midway Atoll. Palmyra Atoll has no permanent residents but it has private landholdings that are continuously occupied by temporary residents.

List of largest uninhabited islands

Most of the largest uninhabited islands are many miles inside the Arctic or Antarctic circles, indicating that the reason for their desertedness is the freezing climate.

In literature and popular culture

The first known novels to be set on a desert island were Hayy ibn Yaqdhan written by Ibn Tufail (1105–1185), followed by Theologus Autodidactus written by Ibn al-Nafis (1213–1288). The protagonists in both (Hayy in Hayy ibn Yaqdhan and Kamil in Theologus Autodidactus) are feral children living in seclusion on a deserted island, until they eventually come in contact with castaways from the outside world who are stranded on the island. The story of Theologus Autodidactus, however, extends beyond the deserted island setting when the castaways take Kamil back to civilization with them.

William Shakespeare's 1610–11 play, The Tempest, uses the idea of being stranded on a desert island as a pretext for the action of the play. Prospero and his daughter Miranda are set adrift by Prospero's treacherous brother Antonio, seeking to become Duke of Milan, and Prospero in turn shipwrecks his brother and other men of sin onto the island.

A Latin translation of Ibn Tufail's Hayy ibn Yaqdhan appeared in 1671, prepared by Edward Pococke the Younger, followed by an English translation by Simon Ockley in 1708, as well as German and Dutch translations. In the late 17th century, Hayy ibn Yaqdhan inspired Robert Boyle, an acquaintance of Pococke, to write his own philosophical novel set on a deserted island, The Aspiring Naturalist. Ibn al-Nafis' Theologus Autodidactus was also eventually translated into English in the early 20th century.

Published in 1719, Daniel Defoe's novel Robinson Crusoe about a castaway on a desert island has spawned so many imitations in film, television and radio that its name was used to define a genre, Robinsonade. The novel features Man Friday, Crusoe's personal assistant. It is likely that Defoe took inspiration for Crusoe from a Scottish sailor named Alexander Selkirk, who was rescued in 1709 after four years on the otherwise uninhabited Juan Fernández Islands; Defoe usually made use of current events for his plots. It is also likely that he was inspired by the Latin or English translations of Ibn Tufail's Hayy ibn Yaqdhan.

Noel Paul Stookey sang a song about living on a desert island called "On a Desert Island (With You in My Dreams)" on Peter, Paul & Mary's 1965 album: "See What Tomorrow Brings".

Tom Neale was a New Zealander who voluntarily spent 16 years in three sessions in the 1950s and 1960s living alone on the island of Suwarrow in the Northern Cook Islands group.  His time there is documented in his autobiography, An Island To Oneself.

In the popular conception, such islands are often located in the Pacific, tropical, uninhabited and usually uncharted. They are remote locales that offer escape and force people marooned or stranded as castaways to become self-sufficient and essentially create a new society. This society can either be utopian, based on an ingenious re-creation of society's comforts (as in Swiss Family Robinson and, in a humorous form, Gilligan's Island) or a regression into savagery (the major theme of both Lord of the Flies and The Beach).

Desert islands are also a hugely popular image for gag cartoons, the island being conventionally depicted as just a few yards across with a single palm tree (probably due to the visual constraints of the medium). 17 such cartoons appeared in The New Yorker in 1957 alone.

A special variation of the desert island theme appears in H.G.Wells's The War in the Air. As part of the cataclysmic global war depicted, the bridges linking Goat Island in the middle of the Niagara Falls to the mainland are cut, and with civilization fast breaking down a few survivors stranded on the island can't expect rescue and must rely on their own resources - embarking on a grim life and death struggle.  

The top "dream vacation" for heterosexual men surveyed by Psychology Today was "marooned on a tropical island with several members of the opposite sex".

Historical castaways

In 1820, the crew of the whaler Essex spent time on uninhabited Henderson Island. There they gorged on birds, fish, and vegetation and found a small freshwater spring. After one week, they had depleted the island's resources and most of the crew left on three whaleboats, while three of the men decided to remain on the island and survived there for four months until their rescue.

See also

 List of uninhabited regions
 List of islands by population
 Bonin Islands, whose name derives from the Japanese for 'desert island'
 Shipwreck, Marooning, Exile, & Castaway
 Castaway depot
 Desert Island Discs

References

External links